Jai Bangladesh (meaning:"Hail Bangladesh") is a 1971 Bollywood military drama film directed by I. S. Johar. The film stars Kabari Choudhury and Dilip Dutt .

Cast
Kabori Sarwar Choudhury   
Dilip Dutt   
Ambika Johar   
I.S. Johar   
Madhumati
Tabassum
Radha Saluja
Alankar Joshi
S.N.Banerji
Rajiv Johar
Laxmi Chhaya

Music
"Duniyawalo O Duniyawalo, Chhote Se Sawal Ka Julam Ke Faile Jaal Ka" - Sushma Shrestha, Lata Mangeshkar
"Ruke Na Jo Jhuke Na Jo, Mite Na Jo Dabe Na Jo" - Mahendra Kapoor
"Masjid Me Mai Hi" - Kishore Kumar
"Dil Tarse Tujhe Dekho" - Usha Mangeshkar, Asha Bhonsle
"Zindagi Tumne Laakho Ki" - Asha Bhonsle

External links
 

1971 films
Films scored by Kalyanji Anandji
1970s Hindi-language films
1971 drama films